Kemar Marshall (born 9 October 1991) is a Jamaican cricketer. He played in two List A matches for the Jamaican cricket team in 2010.

See also
 List of Jamaican representative cricketers

References

External links
 

1991 births
Living people
Jamaican cricketers
Jamaica cricketers